Iolaus aemulus, the short-barred sapphire, is a butterfly of the family Lycaenidae. It is found from South Africa to coastal eastern Kenya. In South Africa it is found along the coast of Eastern Cape to KwaZulu-Natal, then to Ndumu in Zululand.

The wingspan is 25.5–29.5 mm for males and 26–29 mm for females. Adults are on wing year round but mainly from September to May, with peaks in November and February or March.

The larvae feed on Oncocalyx quinquenervius and Oncocalyx bolusii.

References

External links

Images representing Iolaus aemulus at Barcodes of Life
Die Gross-Schmetterlinge der Erde 13: Die Afrikanischen Tagfalter. Plate XIII 68 g

Butterflies described in 1895
Iolaus (butterfly)
Butterflies of Africa